John Jacob “Rifle Jack” Peterson was a Revolutionary war era patriot of African and Kitchewan descent whose quick thinking helped repel British forces in Croton, New York. His actions threw Benedict Arnold’s treasonous plans into disarray and led to the capture of Major Andre. This heroism inspired the erection of a memorial plaque at Teller's Point, now Croton Point, in Croton New York. The plaque also commemorates the actions of George (aka Moses) Sherwood but the marker has been more popularly known as the Jack Peterson Memorial.

History
In September 1780, Peterson, and a fellow private class soldier named Moses Sherwood who were then living near Croton Point spied the English vessel Vulture sending a rowboat of men towards land. A skilled marksman and seasoned member of the 3rd Westchester militia, Peterson fired on the rowboat, forcing its occupants to return to the ship. The two patriots then sped to Fort Lafayette to alert their commander about the vessel. Acting upon this information, troops set up a cannon at Tellers Point to attack the sloop in a fiery battle that lasted two hours. These actions contributed to the later capture of Major Andre, who would have been rescued by the British but was instead stranded on shore.

Peterson was given land in Cortlandt and later moved to Peekskill.

Despite his contributions to this pivotal chapter in American history, Peterson did not receive a pension until age 90 for his bravery. He died in 1850 and was buried at Bethel Cemetery in Croton. The story of his feat of valor was repeated many times and equated to be a vital part of winning the war. Even the log of the British sloop cited the event and “complained of a violation of the military rule in that a boat the day before had been decoyed and fired upon by armed men concealed in the bushes.”

Memorial

The suggestion of a monument to commemorate both Peterson and Sherwood's attack on the British was raised as early as 1859. Noted Westchester historians Bolton and Scharf also credited the two men "for causing the departure of the Vulture and the change in Andre’s route to British headquarters in New York City, necessitating his attempt to deliver the plans of West Point by land through Westchester County which resulted in his capture at Tarrytown."

In 1963, one writer said the two belonged "to the Valhalla of America's great."

A plaque was finally unveiled in 1967 by the Mohegan Chapter of the Daughters of the American Revolution (DAR). The inscription says "Commemorating the defense of Teller's Point by George Sherwood and Jack Peterson who repulsed the landing of British troops from the "Vulture" September 21, 1780, aiding in the capture of Major Andre." The monument is located in today's Croton Point Park.

In 2004 the site of Peterson's heroism was added to the African American Heritage Trail of Westchester County based on research conducted by Dr. Larry Spruill. According to then Westchester County Executive Andrew Spano, a former history teacher, the selection of the site as one of 13 educational tour stops was made with the input of the African-American Advisory Board.

Today the memorial is one of 14 sites on the African American Heritage Trail.

See also 

Black Patriot

References

African-American military monuments and memorials
American Revolutionary War monuments and memorials
Patriots in the American Revolution
African-American history of Westchester County, New York